Jozef Daňo (born 28 December 1968) is a Slovak former professional ice hockey player. He competed in the men's tournaments at the 1994 Winter Olympics and the 1998 Winter Olympics. His son, Marko Daňo, also plays ice hockey.

Career statistics

Regular season and playoffs

International

References

External links

1968 births
Czechoslovak ice hockey left wingers
Living people
Olympic ice hockey players of Slovakia
HK Dukla Trenčín players
HC Oceláři Třinec players
Ice hockey players at the 1994 Winter Olympics
Ice hockey players at the 1998 Winter Olympics
Sportspeople from Nitra
Slovak ice hockey left wingers
Slovak expatriate ice hockey players in the Czech Republic
Slovak expatriate ice hockey players in Russia
Slovak expatriate sportspeople in Austria
Expatriate ice hockey players in Austria